Francisco González Valer, S.F. (born May 22, 1939) is a Spanish-born American prelate of the Roman Catholic Church. González served as an auxiliary bishop of the Archdiocese of Washington, D.C. from 2001 to 2014.

Biography

Early life 
One of five children, Francisco González Valer was born on May 22, 1939, in Arcos de Jalón in the province of Soria, Spain. He has a brother and sister who are both members of Catholic religious orders in Spain. González entered the Seminario Misional de la Sagrada Familia in Barcelona in 1951, and took his final vows in the religious congregation of the Sons of the Holy Family in 1960.

González came to the United States to study theology at the Catholic University of America, obtaining a Master of Arts degree in comparative international education in 1967.

Priesthood 
On May 1, 1964, González was ordained into the priesthood for the Sons of the Holy Family order by Bishop John J. Russell in Richmond, Virginia.

In 1986, González became a teacher at the Academy of the Holy Cross in Kensington, Maryland, serving there until 1971. González then held pastoral assignments in the Archdiocese of Santa Fe, also serving as advocate and pro-synodal judge at the Marriage Tribunal. In 1975, González returned to Spain to teach and perform pastoral work for a year. In 1982, after returning to the United States, González was assigned as was pastor of Our Lady of Peace Parish in Greeley, Colorado, serving there until 1983.

In 1984, González moved back to Maryland, teaching at St. John's School in Frederick until 1986. In 1986, He was appointed as director of Hispanic, Cursillo, and Charismatic movements in the Archdiocese of Washington.  He was named the national chaplain for Cursillo in 1987, serving there until 1989.  González was appointed coordinator of the Hispanic Family Life Office in 1992.  In 1993, González started writing a weekly column for the El Pregonero newspaper.

González was named pastor of Our Lady of Sorrows Parish in Takoma Park, Maryland, in 1996.  The next year, he was transferred to the position of episcopal vicar for Hispanic Catholics. González's congregation elected him three times as a delegate to their General Chapters. He also served as rector of Holy Family Seminary in Silver Spring, Maryland, and as vice-provincial superior for the Sons of the Holy Family in the United States until 2001.

Auxiliary Bishop of Washington
On December 28, 2001,  Pope John Paul II, appointed González as an auxiliary bishop of the Archdiocese of Washington D.C. and the titular bishop of Lamphua.  He was consecrated on February 11, 2002, by then Cardinal Theodore McCarrick, with Cardinal James Hickey and Bishop Leonard Olivier serving as co-consecrators.  González was the first member of his order to be appointed as a bishop.

Retirement 
On May 27, 2014, González submitted his letter of resignation as auxiliary bishop of the Archdiocese of Washington to Pope Francis, having reached the mandatory retirement age for bishops of 75. On October 8, 2021, González moved back to Spain to be with his family.

See also
 

 Catholic Church hierarchy
 Catholic Church in the United States
 Historical list of the Catholic bishops of the United States
 List of Catholic bishops of the United States
 Lists of patriarchs, archbishops, and bishops

References

External links
 Roman Catholic Archdiocese of Washington Official Site

Episcopal succession

1939 births
Living people
People from the Province of Soria
21st-century American Roman Catholic titular bishops
Spanish Roman Catholic bishops in North America
Catholic University of America alumni
Spanish emigrants to the United States
Roman Catholic Archdiocese of Washington
Roman Catholic bishops in Washington, D.C.